Murray Gardner (born 1946) is an alpine skier from New Zealand.

In the 1968 Winter Olympics at Grenoble, he came 76th in the Giant Slalom, but did not qualify in the Downhill.

References 
 Black Gold by Ron Palenski (2008, 2004 New Zealand Sports Hall of Fame, Dunedin) p. 104

External links 
 
 

Living people
1946 births
New Zealand male alpine skiers
Olympic alpine skiers of New Zealand
Alpine skiers at the 1968 Winter Olympics